Phom may refer to:

 Phom Naga, a tribe of Nagaland, north-east India
 Phom language, the Sino-Tibetan language spoken by them
 PhoM, or Mass Communication Specialist, an occupational rating in the US Navy